Vasili Yakovlevich Zinger (February 11, 1836 – March 2, 1907) was a prominent Russian mathematician, botanist and philosopher. His name is sometimes spelled Wasili Jakowlewitsch Zinger.

Biography
Zinger was born in Moscow (Russia). His father was a teacher of mathematics. Zinger graduated in 1859 from Moscow University, where he majored in mathematics. He earned his doctoral degree in 1867. Zinger was an active member of the Moscow Mathematical Society and the president of the Society (1886–1891).

He also wrote some philosophical essays.

Zinger as botanist 
Zinger was also a botanist and wrote some works about the plants of central Russia.

Zingeria of the Poaceae was named in honour of Vasily Zinger.

Notes

External links

1836 births
1907 deaths
19th-century botanists from the Russian Empire
19th-century mathematicians from the Russian Empire
Russian philosophers
Russian people of German descent